Marjorie Hill Allee (June 2, 1890 in Carthage, Indiana – April 30, 1945 in Chicago) was an American author.

Early life
She was born in Carthage, Indiana to William B. Hill and Anna Elliott Hill and grew up on a farm in a Quaker community. After attending Earlham College, she returned to teach in the one-room school she had attended herself. The next year, she attended the University of Chicago, intending to become a writer, and graduated in 1911 with a Ph.B. In 1912, she married zoologist Warder Clyde Allee. Throughout his career, she would assist Allee in the preparation of his scientific publications, occasionally serving as co-author.

Career 
Her first book, a collaboration with Warder Allee, was Jungle Island (1925), a nonfiction children's book describing the flora and fauna of Barro Colorado Island in the Panama Canal inspired by their stay at the Barro Colorado Island Laboratory in the winter of 1924. Other, similarly themed books by Allee were Jane's Island (1931), a novel about scientific exploration at Woods Hole, Massachusetts which was a Newbery Honor book, and Ann's Surprising Summer (1933), a novel about biologists working to preserve the dune country of northern Indiana.

Allee wrote six historical novels about Quaker families confronting the changes of mid-19th century America. Three of them, Judith Lankester (1930), A House of Her Own (1934), and Off to Philadelphia (1936), were about the struggles of the widow Charity Lankester and her eight daughters. More contemporary works by Allen include The Great Tradition (1937), a novel about women studying in a biology laboratory at the University of Chicago which was a serious contrast with the frivolous activities usually depicted in college novels, and The House (1944), a work about relationships between people of different ages, races, and social backgrounds which received the Children's Book Award (now the Josette Frank Award) from the Child Study Association of America.

Bibliography

 Jungle Island (1925) with Warder Clyde Allee
 Susanna and Tristam (1929)
 Judith Lankester (1930)
 Jane's Island (1931)
 The Road to Carolina (1932)
 Ann's Surprising Summer (1933)
 A House of Her Own (1934)
 Off to Philadelphia (1936)
 The Great Tradition (1937)
 The Little American Girl (1938)
 Runaway Linda (1939)
 The Camp at Westlands (1941)
 Winter's Mischief (1942)
 The House (1944)
 Smoke Jumper (1945)

References

External links
 
 
 Jungle Island at the Internet Archive

1890 births
1945 deaths
20th-century American novelists
20th-century American women writers
American children's writers
American historical novelists
American women novelists
Earlham College alumni
Newbery Honor winners
Novelists from Indiana
People from Rush County, Indiana
University of Chicago alumni
Women historical novelists